The Delphi Bureau is an American dramatic television series aired in the United States by ABC as one of three elements of The Men, a wheel series shown as part of its 1972-73 schedule.

The Delphi Bureau starred Laurence Luckinbill as Glenn Garth Gregory, a man with a photographic memory, whose obscure United States Government "agency" ostensibly did obscure research for the President of the United States.  Its actual role was counter-espionage and its main operative was Gregory, whose liaison with the group's unnamed superiors was Sybil Van Lowreen (Anne Jeffreys), a Washington D.C. society hostess.  (Celeste Holm had played Sybil Van Lowreen in the series' pilot film.) 
 
A framing design for each episode involved a limerick, a single new line of which was added for each segment of the show, until the entire limerick was completed in the final segment.

Episode list

References
 Brooks, Tim and Marsh, Earle, The Complete Directory to Prime Time Network and Cable TV Shows

External links
 
 

American Broadcasting Company original programming
Espionage television series
1972 American television series debuts
1973 American television series endings
Television series by Warner Bros. Television Studios
Television shows set in Baltimore